The Glasgow Outcome Score (GOS) is a scale of patients with brain injuries, such as cerebral traumas that groups victims by the objective degree of recovery. The first description was in 1975 by Jennett and Bond.


Application 
The Glasgow Outcome Score applies to patients with brain damage allowing the objective assessment of their recovery in five categories. This allows a prediction of the long-term course of rehabilitation to return to work and everyday life.

Expanded scale 
The Glasgow Outcome Scale Extended (GOSE) is an expanded version of the scale which helps to evaluate global disability and recovery after traumatic brain injuries. It subdivides the upper three categories:

References

Diagnostic emergency medicine
Medical scales
Neuropsychological tests